Municipal elections in Canada fall within the jurisdiction of the various provinces and territories, who usually hold their municipal elections on the same date every two, three or four years, depending on the location.  

Each province has its own nomenclature for municipalities and some have local elections for unincorporated areas which are not technically municipalities. These entities can be called cities, towns, villages, townships, hamlets, parishes and, simply, municipalities, county municipalities, regional county municipalities, municipal districts, regional districts, counties, regional municipalities, specialized municipalities, district municipalities or rural municipalities. Many of these may be used by Statistics Canada as the basis for census divisions or census subdivisions. 

Municipal elections usually elect a mayor and city council and often also a school board. Some locations may also elect other bodies, such as Vancouver, which elects its own parks board. Some municipalities will also hold referenda or ballot initiatives at the same time, usually relating to spending projects or tax changes. 

Elections for city councils are held through either a ward system or an at-large system, depending on the location. Vancouver is the largest city in Canada to use the at-large system, while most other large cities use wards. 

Most councils are non-partisan and elect only independents. However, some municipalities have locally based political parties or election slates. These include Montreal, Quebec City and Longueuil in Quebec and Vancouver, Victoria, Surrey and Richmond in British Columbia. These local parties are rarely affiliated with any provincial or federal parties.

Voting may be done with paper ballots that are hand-counted, or by various forms of electronic voting.

Municipal election chart by province and territory

See also
2023 Canadian electoral calendar
Elections in Canada
Municipal government in Canada
Provincial elections in Canada

References

External links
Public Service Commissions of Canada - Upcoming Elections